Biyavra Rajgarh railway station is a railway station in Rajgarh district, Madhya Pradesh. Its code is BRRG. It serves Biyavra city. The station consists of two platforms. It lacks many facilities including water and sanitation. Passenger, Express, and Superfast trains halt here.

Trains

The following trains halt at Biyavra Rajgarh railway station in both directions:

 Ratlam–Gwalior Express
 Ratlam–Bhind Express
 Gorakhpur–Okha Express
 Ujjaini Express
 Indore–Kota Intercity Express
 Indore–Chandigarh Express
 Ahmedabad–Darbhanga Sabarmati Express
 Sabarmati Express
 Indore–Amritsar Express
 Pune–Gwalior Weekly Express
 Indore–Dehradun Express
 Jhansi–Bandra Terminus Express
 Surat–Muzaffarpur Express

References

Railway stations in Rajgarh district
Bhopal railway division